The Huaihua–Shaoyang–Hengyang railway is a railway line in China.

History
Construction started in 2014. The line opened on 26 December 2018.

Operational Stations

References

Railway lines in China
Railway lines opened in 2018